Gyrocheilos is a genus of flowering plants belonging to the family Gesneriaceae.

Its native range is Southern China.

Species:

Gyrocheilos chorisepalus 
Gyrocheilos lasiocalyx 
Gyrocheilos microtrichus 
Gyrocheilos orbiculatum 
Gyrocheilos retrotrichus

References

Didymocarpoideae
Gesneriaceae genera